Sorolopha plinthograpta is a moth of the family Tortricidae. It is found in Thailand, Korea, Japan, Taiwan and eastern Java.

The wingspan is 17–19 mm. The ground colour is slaty grey with a slight violet tinge. The markings are unicolourous dark brown. The hindwings are deep purplish brown, becoming almost black towards the margin.

References

Moths described in 1931
Olethreutini
Moths of Asia